Serhiy Viktorovych Zhadan (born 23 August 1974 in Starobilsk, Luhansk oblast, Ukraine) is a Ukrainian poet, novelist, essayist, musician, translator, and social activist.

Life and career
Zhadan was born in Starobilsk, Luhansk Oblast in Ukraine. He graduated from H.S. Skovoroda Kharkiv National Pedagogical University in 1996 with a thesis on the work of Mykhaylo Semenko and the Ukrainian Futurist writers of the 1920s. He then spent three years as a graduate student of philology, and taught Ukrainian and world literature from 2000 to 2004. Since then he has worked as a freelance writer.

Starting his career in 1990, his verses revolutionized Ukrainian poetry: they were less sentimental, reviving the style of 1920s Ukrainian avant-garde writers like Semenko or Johanssen. And they drew upon his homeland: the industrial landscapes of East Ukraine. Voroshilovgrad (the Soviet name for Luhansk) tells a story of a young man called Herman who left his home city Starobilsk (in the Luhansk region) but who has to come back to his native lands to protect something that belongs to him. Based on the book, Yaroslav Lodygin directed the award-winning movie The Wild Fields (Дике поле, 2018).

Zhadan is an internationally known Ukrainian writer, with 12 books of poetry and 7 novels, and winner of more than a dozen literary awards. In March 2008, the Russian translation of his novel Anarchy in the UKR made the shortlist of the National Bestseller Prize. It was also a contender for "Book of the Year" at the 2008 Moscow International Book Exhibition. In 2009, he won the Joseph Conrad-Korzeniowski Literary Prize. In 2012, Gunshot and Knife won Ukrainian rating "Book of the Year" for fiction. His 2010 novel Voroshylovhrad won him the Jan Michalski Prize for Literature in Switzerland, BBC Ukrainian's "Book of the Decade" award and Brücke Berlin Prize.  His selected poems Dynamo Kharkiv won Ukrainian "Book of the Year." (2014) His book Mesopotamia won the Angelus literature prize in 2015, the Award of the President of Ukraine "Ukrainian Book of the Year" in 2016.

From 2016 to 2019, he was a member of the Taras Shevchenko National Award Committee of Ukraine.

Zhadan has translated poetry from German, English, Belarusian, and Russian, from such poets as Paul Celan and Charles Bukowski. His own works have been translated into German, English, Estonian, French, Italian, Swedish, Norwegian, Polish, Serbian, Croatian, Lithuanian, Latvian, Belarusian, Russian, Hungarian, Armenian, and Czech.

His translated poetry has appeared in   Ambit , Asymptote, Blackbird , Gulf Coast, The Manchester Review, Modern Poetry in Translation, Poetry International, Poetry International Web , Plume., The Threepenny Review, Tin House, and Virginia Quarterly Review.

Theater and multimedia projects 
His novel Anthem of Democratic Youth has been adapted for the stage and performed at the Ivan Franko National Academic Drama Theater in Kyiv. Since 2004, he has worked with Yara Arts Group from La MaMa Experimental Theatre in New York, contributing to the shows: "Koliada: Twelve Dishes" (2005), "Underground Dreams"(2013–2014), "Hitting Bedrock" (2015) and "1917–2017: Tychyna, Zhadan and the Dogs," (2017), which received two New York Innovative Theatre Awards.

His poems "Spy," "Chaplain" and "Needle," translated by Tkacz and Phipps were part of "Blind Spot," an installation by Mykola Ridnyi and Serhii Zhadan for the Ukrainian Pavilion at the Venice Biennale May–July 2015.

Music projects 
Zhadan collaborated with Kharkiv-based music band Luk. Most of Luk's Ukrainian-language songs included lyrics based on works by Zhadan (in particular the first album Tourist zone is based on Zhadan's play Merry Christmas, Jesus Christ).

The tribute album Khor monholskykh militsioneriv (Mongolian police choir) was released in 2008. The songs include lyrics by Zhadan, performed by Kharkiv musicians.

Since 2007, Zhadan has collaborated with another Kharkiv band Sobaky v Kosmosi, now known as Zhadan and the Dogs. They have released the albums The Army Sports Club (Sportyvny Klub Armiyi, 2008), Weapons of the Proletatiat (Zbroya Proletariatu, 2012), Fight for Her (Byisya za neyi, 2012), Dogs (Sobaky, 2016) and Madonna (2019), Lead (Vedy, OST Rhino, 2022)

In 2021, Zhadan recorded a full-length album titled "Fokstroty" with Yuriy Gurzhy, a Ukrainian-born, Berlin-based musician, DJ, and producer.

Political activism 

Zhadan's active involvement in Ukrainian politics began while a student and has continued throughout the various political crises in Ukraine. In 1992, he was one of the organizers of Kharkiv neo-futuristic literary group "The Red Thistle". He participated in the 2004 Orange Revolution demonstrations against corruption and voter intimidation in the presidential run-off elections, was the commandant of a tent camp in Kharkiv. The protests resulted in a revote ordered by Ukraine's Supreme Court. He has repeatedly expressed sympathy for anarchists, and in many of his works there are "left" motives.

In 2013, he was a member of the coordination council of Euromaidan Kharkiv, part of the nationwide protests and violent clashes with police. In the aftermaths of the 5-day Maidan revolution, which resulted in Russian-backed President Yanukovych’s resignation, he was assaulted outside the administration building in Kharkiv.

Since 2014, Zhadan has made numerous visits to the front lines of the Eastern Donbas region involved in armed conflict with Russian separatists. In February 2017, he co-founded Serhiy Zhadan Charitable Foundation to provide humanitarian aid to front-line cities.

When asked, Zhadan has described his political commitments in the following manner:

 

After the 2022 Russian invasion of Ukraine, Zhadan remained in his hometown of Kharkiv, helping to organize humanitarian aid.

Critical reception 

Rostislav Melnikov and Yuriy Tsaplin of the New Literary Review wrote in 2007:

Zhadan's prose is so poetic, his free verse so prosaic. It is difficult to assign a genre to his work: memoir, travelogue, timely or untimely meditation – or a mixture of all these, centered on the themes my generation and our epoch.

Kirill Ankudinov, writing for Vzglyad.ru in June 2008, said:

There is no summarizing the spicy, hot, sweet, vicious improvisations of Serhiy Zhadan – this is verbal jazz. When you read him, you fear for contemporary Russian literature: of those now writing in the Russian language, there is none among them who is so infernally free (and above all, free from "writerly" prose, from the tendency to "produce an impression").On 5 March 2022 Polish Academy of Sciences nominated him for the Nobel Prize in Literature.

Books by Serhiy Zhadan published in English translation
 A new orthography : poems, Sandpoint, Idaho: Lost Horse Press, 2020. 
 The Orphanage: A Novel, translated by Reilly Costigan‑Humes and Isaac Stackhouse Wheeler, (Yale University Press, 2021) 
 What We Live For, What We Die For: Selected Poems by Serhiy Zhadan, translated by Viralna Tkacz and Wanda Phipps, (New Haven: Yale University Press, 2019). 
 Mesopotamia by Serhiy Zhadan, prose translated by Reilly Costigan-Humes & Isaac Stackhouse Wheele poetry translated by Viralna Tkacz and Wanda Phipps, (New Haven: Yale University Press, 2018). 
 Voroshilovgrad by Serhiy Zhadan, translated by Isaac Stackhouse Wheeler and Reilly Costigan-Humes, (Dallas: Deep Velum, 2016) 
 Depeche Mode by Serhiy Zhadan, translated by Miroslav Shkandrij (London: Glagoslav Publications, 2013).

In other languages 

 Big Mac (Біг Мак. Перезавантаження) — Poland, Czarne, 2005.
 Depeche Mode (Депеш Мод) — Poland, Czarne, 2006.
 Hymn demokratycznej młodzieży (Гімн демократичної молоді) — Poland, Czarne, 2008.
 Hymne der Demokratischen Jugend (Гімн демократичної молоді) — Germany, Suhrkamp, 2009.
 Die Erfindung des Jazz im Donbass (Ворошиловград) — Germany, Suhrkamp, 2012.
 Voroshilovgrad — Ukraine, 2011, 2012 (in Russian).
 Vorosilovgrád (Ворошиловград) — Hungary, Európa, 2012.
 La Route du Donbass (Ворошиловград) — France, Noir sur Blanc, 2013.
 Woroszyłowgrad (Ворошиловград) — Poland, Czarne, 2013.
 Mezopotamia (Месопотамія) — Poland, Czarne, 2014.
 Ze života Marie (Життя Марії) — Czech Republic, Větrné mlýny, 2015.
 Варашылаўград (Ворошиловград) — Belarus, Логвінаў, 2016.
 Džezs pār Donbasu (Ворошиловград) — Latvia, Jāņa Rozes Apgāds, 2016.
 Fire Arms and Knives (Вогнепальні й ножові) — Russia, 2016.
 La strada del Donbas (Ворошиловград) — Spain, Voland, 2016.
 Why I'm not on social networks — Poems from the war — Germany, 2016.
 Drohobycz (poems) — Poland, Państwowy Instytut Wydawniczy, 2018.
 Hymna demokratickej mládeže (Гімн демократичної молоді) — Slovakia, OZ Brak, 2018.
 Poems — Belarus, 2018.
 Vorosjylovhrad (Ворошиловград) — Netherlands, De Geus, 2018.
 Vorošilovgrad (Ворошиловград) — Slovenia, Beletrina, 2018.
 ვოროშილოვგრადი (Ворошиловград) — Georgia, ინტელექტი, 2018.
 Internat (Інтернат) — Poland, Czarne, 2019.
 What we live for, what we die for (poems) — USA, 2019.
 Antena (Антена) — Poland, Warstwy, 2020.
 The Orphanage (Інтернат) — Denmark, Jensen & Dalgaard I/S, 2020.
 Depeche Mode (Депеш Мод) — Estonia, 2020.
 Anthem of democratic youth (Гімн демократичної молоді) — France, Espace Instant, 2020.
 Internatas (Інтернат) – Lithuania, Kitos knygos, 2021. 
 Himmel über Charkiw. Nachrichten vom Überleben im Krieg - Germany: Suhrkamp Verlag, Berlin 2022.

Works

Poetry 
 Quotations (Цитатник), 1995.
 General Judas (Генерал Юда), 1995.
 Pepsi (Пепсі), (1998).
 The very best poems, psychedelic stories of fighting and other bullshit: Selected Poems, 1992–2000 (Вибрані поезії), 2000.
 Ballads about War and Reconstruction (Балади про війну і відбудову), 2001.
 The History of Culture at the Beginning of This Century (Історія культури початку століття), (2003)
 UkSSR (У.Р.С.Р.), 2004.
 Maradona (Марадона), 2007.
 Ethiopia (Ефіопія), 2009.
 Lili Marlene (Лілі Марлен), 2009.
 Fire Arms and Knives (Вогнепальні й ножові), 2012.
 Life of Maria (Життя Марії), 2015.
 Templars (Тамплієри), 2016.
 Antenna (Aнтена), 2018.
 List of Ships (Список кораблів), 2019.
 Psalm to Aviation (Псалом авіації), 2021.
 What We Live For, What We Die For: Selected Poems (a selection of Zhadan's work translated into English), 2019.

Prose 
 Big Mac (Біґ Мак; short story collection), 2003.
 Depeche Mode (Депеш Мод), 2004; Glagoslav Publications Limited, 2013, 
 Anarchy in the UKR, 2005.
 Anthem of Democratic Youth (Гімн демократичної молоді), 2006.
 Big Mac² (Біґ Мак²; short story collection), 2007.
 Voroshilovgrad (Ворошиловград), 2010; Deep Vellum Publishing, 2016, .
 Big Mac and Other Stories (Біґ Мак та інші історії), 2011.
 Mesopotamia (Месопотамія; nine stories and thirty poems), 2014.
  The Orphanage (Інтернат), 2017.

Compilations 
 Capital (Капітал), 2006 — includes everything but The History of Culture at the Beginning of the Century, Big Mac, and Maradona.

Anthologized poetry 
 Stanislav+2 (Станислав+2), 2001.
 Ch-Time – Verses on Chechnya and Not Only (Время `Ч`. Стихи о Чечне и не только), 2001.
 We Will Not Die in Paris (Мы умрем не в Париже), 2002.
 The History of Culture (История культуры), 2004.
 The UnKnown Ukraine (НеИзвестная Украина), 2005.

Awards
 Jan Michalski Prize for Literature, awarded in 2014 for Voroshylovhrad
 BBC Ukrainian's Book of the Decade award in December 2014 for Voroshylovhrad
 Angelus Award (2015), for his book Mesopotamia, translated to Polish by Michał Petryk and Adam Pomorski
EBRD Literature Prize (2022), for his book The Orphanage, translated to English by Reilly Costigan-Humes and Isaac Stackhouse Wheeler
Friedenspreis des Deutschen Buchhandels (2022).

References

External links 

The Bard of Eastern Ukraine, Where Things Are Falling Apart. The New Yorker. Marci Shore. 2016.
The Abuse of Ukraine's Best-Known Poet. The New Yorker. Sally McGrane. 2014.
The Word in a Time of War. Asymptote. Mayhill Fowler on Serhiy Zhadan.
 Ukraine's Mesopotamia. LRB Blog. Peter Pomerantsev.
 In Transcarpathia. LRB Blog. Peter Pomerantsev.
 Crimean Dreams. LRB Blog Peter Pomerantsev.
 Born in 1974 and 1984, Torn in 2004 and 2014.... World Literature Today. Jutta Lindekugel. 2014.

1974 births
Living people
People from Starobilsk
20th-century Ukrainian poets
Ukrainian novelists
Ukrainian translators
Translators from Russian
Translators from German
Translators from English
Translators from Belarusian
Translators to Ukrainian
People of the Orange Revolution
People of the Euromaidan
21st-century translators
21st-century Ukrainian poets
Ukrainian male poets
Ukrainian writers
Ukrainian science fiction writers